Heart to Mouth is the fifth studio album by American singer-songwriter LP, released on December 7, 2018, through BMG. It was preceded by the singles "Girls Go Wild" and "Recovery".

Background
LP said she named the album Heart to Mouth because she feels that when she comes up with melodies, she "can feel that direct line from my heart to my mouth", and that "whether they're sadder songs or big anthems, they all come from the same place."

Music
Gay Star News described the album's sound as "confessional pop-rock", while it was noted as "full pop" by Independent.ie.

Critical reception

James Robinson of Independent.ie said that LP's "smart lyrics that characterised previous releases are all in tact, [sic] delivered in her inimitable Roy Orbison-on-helium tones, but they're matched with an appealing electro-pop backing", summarizing that "LP might yet steal Lady Gaga's crown as the world's strangest, most versatile hit-maker".

Track listing

Charts

Certifications

References

2018 albums
LP (singer) albums